The Homelands are the mythical lands from fairy tales, folklore, and nursery rhymes in the comic book series Fables. The majority of those listed have been conquered by the mysterious Adversary, as he has conquered most of the European Fable lands. This is a list of the Homelands that have been directly referenced in Fables and its spin-offs Jack of Fables, Cinderella: From Fabletown with Love, Cinderella: Fables are Forever and Fairest.

Major lands 

Toscane – Also known as the Imperial Homeworld. This world is Italian in nature, which can be seen in the Roman styles of architecture of Calabri Anagni, the capital city of the Empire. This world is home to several Italian Fables; the Adversary and the characters from the tale of Pinocchio. Formerly the home Sacred grove, now located in the Kingdom of Haven. When translated into Latin, Calabri refers to the Boot heel-shaped peninsula in Italy and Anagni refers to the ancient town in central Italy.
The Kingdom of the Great Lion – A reference to Narnia, It was another land that was conquered early on. Due to the Chronicles of Narnia currently being protected by copyright, the kingdom may never be officially named. The first chapter of "War And Pieces" is called "The Voyage Of The Sky Treader", which may be a reference to The Voyage Of The Dawn Treader (the 5th book in the "Narnia" series, using the internal chronology). In Fables 137 (Camelot, Part Six), Winter refers to a book her mother reads to her and her siblings all the time, about a land where there is always winter, but never Christmas; this is a reference to The Lion, the Witch and the Wardrobe.
Middle-Earth –  A flashback in the Legends in Exile story arc shows short slaves (Hobbits) being whipped by goblins (orcs). Yet another land conquered by the Adversary.
Lilliput – From Gulliver's Travels; It is unknown if the island of Lilliput is conquered by the Adversary, however, the first party that came from Lilliput is now living in Smalltown of Fabletown's upstate Farm annex.
Bornegascar and Madagao – From Fantastic Fables by Ambrose Bierce, the rival kings managed to escape and died side by side in The Last Castle.
The Kingdom of the North Wind – Also referred to as "the North". The lands of the North Wind were not taken, as the Adversary’s minions "knew to leave him alone". Foggytown is located in the Kingdom of the North Wind.
The Rus – A mythical version of Russia and home to many Slavic Fables; Baba Yaga, the mice and the cat from the Russian lubok The Mice are burying the Cat, and Ivan Durak, all came from this world. It was controlled by Baba Yaga, until she was captured in the Battle of Fabletown. Her Knights also patrolled the lands until they were beheaded by Boy Blue. Prose Page spent years in the Rus during her quest for knowledge in the Homelands. Mundane Russia is approximately one-sixteenth the size of the magical Rus.
Dunhill, Viss, Haven, and Lamien – The home of Lumi, the Snow Queen. These were not conquered, as Lumi made a deal in which she would use her powers in the Adversary's service, if he would spare her world.
The Arabian Homeworld – The Arabic Fable Homeworld. It is a primary Islamic world host to places such as Ali Baba's Cave, – Possibly the Karse from Exile's Honor.
Skribnutch
Ynnes
Kurrewyn
Tiabrut – This is the world where Mr. Dark was imprisoned.
Levant – Prose Page spent years there during her quest for knowledge in the Homelands.
Alexandria – Prose Page spent a decade there studying.
Aldara Quoor
Onyx
Stellarholm
Antrigonet
Aragon – A mythical version of Spain and possibly Portugal. Aragon deriving from the Kingdom of Aragon.
Fryslân – A mythical version of combined Friesland and the Netherlands
Bilbao – The mythical Basque Country, Bilbao referring to its capital.
Bretagne – A mythical version of Brittany.
Gascogne – A mythical version of Gascony.
Septimanie – A mythical version of Septimania.
Bourgogne – A mythical version of Burgundy
Aquitaine – A mythical version of Aquitaine that, in contrast to its mundane counterpart, covers the mainland of France.
Kärnten – A mythical version of combined Slovenia, Bosnia and Croatia. Kärnten deriving from Carinthia.
Lotharin – A mythical version of combined Luxembourg and Belgium. Lotharin deriving from Lotharingia.
Scanda – The land of which Prince Lindworm is ruler of.
Westermark – The land that Mister Kadabra was a lord of.
Silene – The homeworld of Saint George.
Lemuria
Cannondale – Where Mr. Brump the goblin is from.
Eastermouse – Where Mr. Brump is also from.
Dunhollow – The homeland of Lady Maeve. 
Hybernia – A tiny Fable homeland, invaded by Baobhan sith and the Cu sith from Scottish mythology.

The Homelands version of China is referred to, but not named, in Cinderella: Fables are Forever, which refers to the empire from the Chinese folktale about Meng Chiang-Nu.

Americana 
Another land of interest is Americana, the Fable version of America, appearing mainly in the Jack of Fables series.

Large areas in Americana include:
 The Colonies – The states of New England.
 Antebellum – The South.
 Lone Star – The state of Texas.
 Steamboat – The Mississippi River area.
 Gangland – The Chicago area during the 1920s.
 The Frontier – covering Kansas, Nebraska, and the Dakotas.
 Idyll – The Appalachian Mountains area during the 1950s.
 The West – covering the Rocky Mountains area.
 The Great White North – Canada and The Arctic.

Significant places in Americana are Big City and Salem located in the Colonies, Steamboat City located in Steamboat, Speakeasy located in Gangland, the Grand Canyon created by Paul Bunyan and unnamed cities in Lone Star, The Frontier  and the Great White North. Kansas is referred to in Cinderella: Fables Are Forever and was the former home of Dorothy Gale

As could be expected from the Homelands, things are not so normal as they should be. The Idyll area seems to be populated entirely by zombies, all being loyal to the Bookburner (who is the head librarian of Americana, the library being located in Idyll), while the Great White North seems to represent how America views Canada and Alaska, as it is very clean, ice hockey being the biggest form of amusement and, according to Jack, having horrible bacon.

Untouched by The Adversary's forces, Americana possesses advanced technology compared with the conquered European worlds where the absence of modern arms is crucial to sustain the ruling system. Vehicles and appliances seen are cars from the 1920s, steam trains, various firearms and even modern household appliances.  Besides, the only known way to enter Americana is by dressing as a vagrant and jumping on a train.

It is also quite possible that other areas are near or on Americana that resemble ancient Mesoamerica or Latin America.

References 

Fables (comics)
Fictional countries